The Sanctuary Basilica of the Assumption of Our Lady, commonly known as the Rotunda of Mosta or the Mosta Dome, is a Roman Catholic parish church and Basilica in Mosta, Malta, dedicated to the Assumption of Mary. It was built between 1833 and the 1860s to neoclassical designs of Giorgio Grognet de Vassé, on the site of an earlier Renaissance church which had been built in around 1614 to designs of Tommaso Dingli.

The design of the present church is based on the Pantheon in Rome, has the third largest unsupported dome in the world and is Malta's largest and most famous church. The church narrowly avoided destruction during World War II when on 9 April 1942 a German aerial bomb pierced the dome and fell into the church during Mass, but failed to explode. This event was interpreted by the Maltese as a miracle.

History
Although Pietro Dusina recorded Mosta as a parish in his 1575 pastoral visit, the town actually became a parish in 1608. Plans to construct a new church began soon afterwards, and the church was built in around 1614 to designs attributed to the Renaissance architect Tommaso Dingli. This church was commonly called Ta' Ziri.

By the 1830s, this church had become too small to cater for the town's population. Giorgio Grognet de Vassé proposed rebuilding the church on a neoclassical design based on the Pantheon in Rome. Despite opposition from Bishop Francesco Saverio Caruana, the design was approved and construction of the church began on 30 May 1833.

The new church was built around the old church, which remained in use throughout the course of construction. The residents of Mosta helped in building the church, taking part in construction work on Sundays and public holidays. Since Grognet had never received any formal architectural training, he received consultation services from an architect of the Sammut family.

The rotunda took 28 years to build, being completed in the early 1860s. The old church was demolished in 1860, and the new church did not need to be consecrated since the site had remained a place of worship throughout the course of construction. The church was officially dedicated on 15 October 1871.

During World War II, the town of Mosta was prone to aerial bombardment due to its proximity to the airfield of RAF Ta Kali. At about 16:40 on 9 April 1942, the Luftwaffe dropped three bombs on the church, and two of them deflected without exploding. The bomb did not explode, and a Royal Engineers Bomb Disposal unit defused it and dumped it into the sea off the west coast of Malta. This event was interpreted as a miracle by the inhabitants, and a similar bomb is now displayed in the sacristy at the back of the church, under the words Il-Miraklu tal-Bomba, 9 ta' April 1942 (meaning "The Bomb Miracle, 9 April 1942").

On 12 December 1973, Pope Paul VI issued a decree of canonical coronation of the titular painting of Our Lady of the Assumption that was crowned later on 10 August 1975, therefore elevating the church to the title of Marian Sanctuary.

On 2 May 1983, taxi driver Carmelo Aquilina voluntarily drove a Mercedes car into the Rotunda following a bet. He drove up the steps of the parvis, broke down the main doorway, and stopped within the church close to the altar. Following the incident, Aquilina was arrested and he received a three-month prison sentence while his driving licence was suspended.

In 2015, the parish requested to the Vatican to be reclassified to the status of a basilica. The church was elevated to a minor basilica on 29 July 2018 by decree of Pope Francis.

Architecture

The Rotunda of Mosta is built in the neoclassical style, and its structure is based on the Pantheon in Rome. Its façade has a portico with six Ionic columns, which is flanked by two bell towers. At one time, the dome was the third largest in the world. The church's interior contains eight niches, including a bay containing the main entrance and a deep apse with the main altar.

Before the church was constructed, there was some opposition to Grognet's design, since some regarded a Roman temple as an unsuitable model for a Catholic church building. However, others praised the design, and an 1839 book written while the church was being built describes it as "certainly the most magnificent, extensive and solid modern building" in Malta. This book further states that "when finished, [the church] will be an ornament to the Island, will immortalize the architect, and draw towards the casal every visitor to Malta." The design was well-received upon completion, and it is regarded as Grognet's masterpiece.

Further reading

See also

Culture of Malta
History of Malta
List of churches in Malta
List of largest domes
Religion in Malta

References

Further reading

External links
Official website

Mosta
Basilica churches in Malta
19th-century Roman Catholic church buildings in Malta
Roman Catholic churches completed in the 1860s
Limestone churches in Malta
Round churches
Church buildings with domes
Rotundas in Europe
Neoclassical church buildings in Malta